Adoagyiri is a town in the Akuapim South Municipal district, a district in the Eastern Region of Ghana.  Adoagyiri is controlled by Akuapim South Municipal District (ASMD). The main ethnic group is Akan, followed by Ewe.

It has Densu river acting as a border between itself and Nsawam. Densu River, is the main source of water for both domestic and industrial purposes for people in and around Nsawam and Adoagyiri.

Education
The town is known for the Saint Martin's Secondary School. The school is a second cycle institution.

References

Villages in Ghana
Populated places in the Eastern Region (Ghana)